Monte Tre Denti (Italian: Mount Three Teeth) is peak in the Cottian Alps, Metropolitan City of Turin in Piedmont, north-western Italy. Together with the nearby Monte Freidour, it is part of a natural park called Parco naturale di interesse provinciale del Monte Tre Denti - Freidour.

Tre Denti